Nicrophorus oberthuri is a burying beetle described by Portevin in 1924.

References

Silphidae
Beetles of North America
Beetles described in 1924